Krzemienica may refer to the following places:
Krzemienica, Łódź Voivodeship (central Poland)
Krzemienica, Łańcut County in Subcarpathian Voivodeship (south-east Poland)
Krzemienica, Mielec County in Subcarpathian Voivodeship (south-east Poland)
Krzemienica, Pomeranian Voivodeship (north Poland)